Attadale is a riverside suburb of Perth, Western Australia, located within the City of Melville.

It was the first subdivision of  Matheson's Melville Water Park Estate. Attadale was named after an estate in Scotland situated on the south side of Loch Carron.

The suburb is located between the central business district and Fremantle along the southern side of the Swan River. Its extensive foreshore has many open spaces for residents and visitors including a large public open space along Burke Drive where residents can take their dogs for recreational activities.

Notable persons 
 Peter Moylan, pitcher for the Atlanta Braves of Major League Baseball, is from Attadale.
 Brendan Nash, former Queensland state cricket player, now playing for the West Indies.
 Luke McPharlin, a key position player for the Fremantle Dockers, attended Attadale Primary School.
 Heath Ledger, actor, has lived in Attadale.
 Mitchell Marsh, cricketer who plays for the Australian national cricket team, Western Australia and Perth Scorchers.
 Shaun Marsh, cricketer who plays for the Australian national cricket team, Western Australia and Perth Scorchers.
 Alex Fasolo, prince of Perth, number 1 for Collingwood Football Club, nicknamed "Fazzy Boy"

Education
Attadale contains three schools: Attadale Primary School, Santa Maria College and Mel Maria Catholic Primary School.

Facilities 
Attadale Tennis Club (also known as St Joseph Pignatelli Tennis Club) is a parish club providing tennis facilities (with six synthetic courts), and was located on the corner of Wichmann Road, and Galloway Street, although the tennis courts have since been demolished to make room for a new church.

References

External links

Suburbs of Perth, Western Australia
Suburbs in the City of Melville